K. P. K. Kumaran, is a politician from the Dravida Munnetra Kazhagam party, is a former member of the Parliament of India who represented Tamil Nadu in the Rajya Sabha, the upper house of the Indian Parliament. He is the son of K. P. Kandasamy and grandson of S. P. Adithanar.

External links
 Official Rajya Sabha website

Rajya Sabha members from Tamil Nadu
Dravida Munnetra Kazhagam politicians
Living people
Year of birth missing (living people)